The 2011 La Flèche Wallonne was the 75th running of La Flèche Wallonne, a single-day cycling race.

As he had done in the closing stages of his winning performance at the Amstel Gold Race three days prior to La Flèche Wallonne, 's Philippe Gilbert attacked on the final uphill climb – the Mur de Huy – to the finish and accelerated away from the field, gapping them by three seconds to take victory and his third classics win in the space of a week, having also won the Brabantse Pijl; the first rider to win all three in the same season. Gilbert also became the first Belgian to win La Flèche Wallonne since Mario Aerts won the race in 2002.

Teams 
25 teams were selected to compete in the 2011 La Flèche Wallonne. All UCI ProTeams were represented as well as seven UCI Professional Continental teams. The teams that competed were:

Results

References

External links

2011 in Belgian sport
2011
2011 UCI World Tour